Græse Bakkeby is a satellite town of Frederikssund in North Zealand.  It is located 3 km north of Frederikssund, in the Capital Region of Denmark.

Notable people 
 Gunnar Bech (1920 in Græse – 1981) a Danish linguist, studied the German verb

References 

Cities and towns in the Capital Region of Denmark
Frederikssund Municipality